Pseudoselinum is a monotypic genus of flowering plants belonging to the family Apiaceae. Its only species is Pseudoselinum angolense, native to Angola.

References

Apiaceae
Monotypic Apiaceae genera